New York State Route 231 (NY 231) is a north–south state highway located in Suffolk County, New York, in the United States. The southernmost  of NY 231 is a limited-access highway known simply as Route 231; the remainder of NY 231 is known as Deer Park Avenue.

Route description 

NY 231 begins at an interchange with NY 27A (Montauk Highway) in Babylon. The route progresses northward around Hawleys Lake as a four-lane freeway. A short distance after NY 27A, NY 231 meets ramps from County Route 50 (CR 50, named John Street), but only provides service to the county road from the southbound direction. 

After John Street, the expressway crosses over the Long Island Rail Road's Babylon Branch and crosses northward through a large residential district. After paralleling Madison Street in North Babylon, NY 231 intersects with NY 27 (the Sunrise Highway) in a full cloverleaf interchange. From NY 27, NY 231 heads northward and northwestward, intersecting with Hunter Avenue in North Babylon, where the expressway portion ends and the highway becomes an arterial boulevard. The route curves back to the north through the large commercial district, interchanging with CR 34 (Deer Park Avenue). Right after the interchange, NY 231 interchanges with the Southern State Parkway at a full cloverleaf in North Babylon.

After the Southern State Parkway, NY 231 continues northward as an arterial boulevard named Deer Park Avenue. The surroundings are mostly commercial, continuing as a four-lane road and intersecting with CR 4 (Commack Road) at a fork. After Commack Road, NY 231 becomes a residential arterial with a grassy, divided median and intersecting with CR 57 (Bay Shore Road) in Deer Park. The highway continues northward through Deer Park, crossing through a large commercial strip and under another Long Island Rail Road line. There is a short interchange with Long Island Avenue in Deer Park as NY 231 continues into Dix Hills, where it becomes residential once again near the intersection with CR 2 (Straight Path).

The arterial road remains residential, continuing northward into an interchange with Interstate 495 (the Long Island Expressway) in Dix Hills. Here, the road widens to five lanes and crosses underneath the interstate, where NY 231 becomes four lanes once again. The highway continues northward along the residential strip, intersecting with CR 67 (the Long Island Motor Parkway). Further to the north, NY 231 enters a partial cloverleaf interchange with the Northern State Parkway, where the NY 231 designation terminates. 

At its northern terminus, Deer Park Avenue forks into two Suffolk County routes, continuing northwest as CR 35 (Deer Park Road, and later, Park Avenue), and northeast as CR 66 (East Deer Park Road).

History 
The entirety of Deer Park Avenue and Deer Park Road was originally designated as part of CR 35 on February 24, 1930.

Governor of New York Nelson Rockefeller announced in 1961 funding would be allocated for the reconstruction and widening of Deer Park Avenue. 

The project would help reduce congestion along the southern section of Deer Park Avenue during commutes and travel on weekends. The project would also help the ability to reduce flooding along Deer Park Avenue, which was a significant problem even during the lightest of rains. To relieve this issue, a system of drainage pipes would be constructed underneath the roadway.

In the 1960s, there were plans to upgrade the entirety of NY 231 into a limited-access highway (see the "Plans for the Babylon-Northport Expressway" section below), leading to much of CR-35 being transferred to the State of New York. However, only a short segment of this route was ever upgraded to a limited-access highway.

Plans for the Babylon-Northport Expressway 

As suggested by its name, the Babylon-Northport Expressway was originally intended to be a north-south expressway spanning most of the width of Long Island, between the NY-27A in the village of Babylon on Long Island's south shore and the intersection of Elwood Road, Fort Salonga Road (NY-25A), and Reservoir Avenue at the southern edge of Northport village on its north shore. However, local opposition to the expressway eventually resulted in the cancellation of the project before anything more than the existing 2 mile stretch could be constructed. Despite this, roughly 40% of properties along the proposed expressway's right-of-way were acquired by NYS for the unbuilt extension, including along Elwood Road, in the vicinity of Northport.

In 1962, the New York State Department of Public Works announced that Deer Park Avenue would be widened for a fourteen-mile stretch from Montauk Highway and NY 25A. The road would be expanded from a two-lane boulevard to a four-lane boulevard, at a cost of about $20 million (1962 USD) with a slated completion of 1970. The first section would have its contract let on May 3, 1962, with a cost of $2.4 million. This stretch would include the piece between the Southern State Parkway and Lake Avenue in Deer Park. The new piece of the right-of-way would be completed by the middle of 1965, in which a new road would be constructed along the  section from the Montauk Highway to the Southern State Parkway.

In the 1960s, the portion of CR 35 between the Southern and Northern State Parkways was transferred to the state of New York, which designated the highway as NY 231. Initially, NY 231 followed Deer Park Avenue (now CR 34) south to NY 27A in Babylon; however, it was realigned  to follow the aforementioned  section of the new Babylon–Northport Expressway.

The map in this section shows the route of the never-built northern segment of the expressway.

Hot Rod Mecca 

For at least 30 years, Deer Park Avenue served as one of the nation's hottest cruising strips. The New York Times twice called the  stretch from North Babylon to Deer Park, New York a "Mecca for young people" where crowds of teens and young adults, usually those below legal drinking age, from Long Island and Queens, would line parking lots, hoods up, chatting and showing off their rides. 

On June 4, 2001, at 7:30 p.m., in part due to a second feature in The New York Times, the Joint Civic and Taxpayers Association met with elected town and New York State Department of Transportation officials for an action plan to crack-down on the drag-racing, littering and cruising calling it a significant quality of life issue for community residents.

Major intersections

See also 
 List of Suffolk County Roads
 List of State Routes in New York

References

External links 

 Photographs, December 28, 2003 at The Expressway Site
 NY 231 (Greater New York Roads) at eastcoastroads.com
 Babylon-Northport Expressway at nycroads.com

231
Transportation in Suffolk County, New York
Roads on Long Island